James Hartley may refer to:
James Hartley (Canadian politician) (1888–1970), provincial politician from Alberta, Canada
James Hartley (British politician) (1811–1886), British Conservative Party politician
James R. Hartley (1833–1868), provincial politician from New Brunswick, Canada
James Joseph Hartley (1858–1944), American prelate of the Roman Catholic Church
Jimmy Hartley (1876–1913), Scottish footballer
James Hartley (East India Company officer) (1745–1799), British officer in the service of the Indian Army

See also